The 1887 Cork Senior Football Championship was the inaugural staging of the Cork Senior Football Championship since its establishment by the Cork County Board. The draw for the opening round fixtures took place on 30 January 1887. The championship began on 6 March 1887 and ended on 10 July 1887.

On 10 July 1887, Lees won the championship following a 0–04 to 0–01 defeat of Lisgoold in the final at Cork Park. The club subsequently represented Cork in the 1887 All-Ireland Championship.

Participation

All clubs in County Cork were invited to participate in the inaugural championship. The closing date for entries was 29 January 1887. The cost of entering a team was 2s 6d.

Results

First round

Semi-final

Lisgoold received a bye in this round as Blarney did not field a team as originally planned.

Final

Championship statistics

Miscellaneous

 The first round match between Lisgoold and Midleton on 15 May 1887 was declared null and void and a replay was ordered. The replay, which ended in a draw after regulation time, was the first ever championship match to feature extra-time. Two fifteen-minute periods were played after the initial hour.

References

Cork Senior Football Championship